PFC Minyor Bobov dol (ПФК Миньор Бобов дол) is a Bulgarian football club from the town of Bobov dol, currently playing in the Bulgarian South-West V AFG, the third division of Bulgarian football.

Honours
 Seventh place in the "B" group: 2004/05
 1/8 finalist in the National Cup tournament: this time its official name is the Cup of Bulgaria 2004/05

External links 
bgclubs.eu webpage

Minyor
Mining association football clubs in Bulgaria